The 2012 American Solar Challenge (ASC) was an intercollegiate solar car race on July 13–21, 2012. The event was won by the University of Michigan. It was the 11th American national championship solar car race held.

Route
Day 1: Sat, July 14: Start in Rochester, New York; must reach stage stop in Erie, Pennsylvania.
Day 2: Sun, July 15: Start in Erie, PA; must reach Mansfield, Ohio checkpoint.
Day 3: Mon, July 16: Finish in Ann Arbor, Michigan.
Day 4: Tue, July 17: Start in Ann Arbor, MI; must reach Kalamazoo, MI checkpoint.
Day 5: Wed, July 18: Finish in Normal, Illinois.
Day 6: Thu, July 19: Start in Normal, IL; must reach Verona, Wisconsin checkpoint.
Day 7: Fri, July 20: Finish in La Crosse, WI.
Day 8: Sat, July 21: Start in La Crosse, WI; finish in St. Paul, Minnesota.

Results

Overall

Stage 1

Stage 2

Stage 3

Stage 4

Stage 5

References

External links
 2012 American Solar Challenge

American Solar Challenge